Bernard Carter may refer to:
 Bernard Carter (banker) (1893–1961), American soldier and banker
 Bernard Carter (American football) (born 1971), American football linebacker
 SS Bernard Carter, a Liberty ship